The Eastern Wilderness Areas Act was signed into law by President Gerald Ford on January 3, 1975. The Act designated 16 new wilderness areas in the Eastern United States, including  of wilderness on national lands in 13 states. Although it was originally untitled, the bill signed by Ford has come to be known as the Eastern Wilderness Areas Act.

The Act built upon the Wilderness Act, which was written by Howard Zahniser of The Wilderness Society and signed into law by President Lyndon B. Johnson in 1964. While the Wilderness Act created the legal definition of wilderness in the United States, the Eastern Wilderness Areas Act applied only to land east of the 100th meridian west.

Background
In 1964, both the Forest Service and Congress agreed that eastern areas would have qualified as wilderness. However, six years later, the Forest Service opposed congressional designation of new wilderness areas in West Virginia with land use histories of logging. In 1971, it adopted a "purity" interpretation for wilderness designation so that no eastern or western lands with a history of human disturbance could qualify as wilderness.

The Forest Service drafted its own bill as an alternative "to establish a system of wild areas within the land of the national forest system" that would have allowed cutting trees to "improve" wildlife habitat and recreation. The organization described the bill as necessary because eastern areas "do not meet the strict criteria of the Wilderness Act." Members of Congress who championed the Wilderness Act resolved to overturn the misconception that wilderness areas included only those "pristine" in nature. Senator Henry Jackson warned of this "serious and fundamental misinterpretation of the Wilderness Act" and pledged himself to correct the falsity of the so-called purity theory. Senator Frank Church, who had been leader of the Senate debate on the Wilderness Act, observed that "the effect of such an interpretation would be to automatically disqualify almost everything, for few if any lands on this continent—or any other—have escaped man’s imprint to some degree."

To counteract the Forest Service bill, advocates for wilderness, including The Wilderness Society, the Sierra Club, and Friends of the Earth, and their congressional allies, responded with the proposed Eastern Wilderness Areas Act.  Promoted largely by Ernie Dickerman, a Wilderness Society staff member, and George Aiken, a senator from Vermont, the Senate endorsed the bill in May 1974.

The final legislation adopted some elements of the Forest Service-inspired bill, but it did not alter the definition and intent of the Wilderness Act of 1964.  The previous debate regarding the meaning of "wilderness" versus "pristine" land led to the understanding that cultural use of lands should not keep the area from being restored to a "secondary wilderness," with functioning natural processes similar to when the land was in a primary state. Therefore, the Eastern Wilderness Areas Act explicitly protects lands that both suffered previous abuse and have the ability to recover and therefore be designated for wilderness protection.

Wilderness areas created

See also
 List of U.S. Wilderness Areas

Bibliography

References

External links
Eastern Wilderness Areas Act, January 3, 1975

Protected areas of the United States
United States federal public land legislation
Act
Environmental law in the United States